Bernolákovo (former Slovak names: Čeklís, Čeklýs) is a village and municipality in western Slovakia in  Senec District in the Bratislava Region.

Names and etymology
The German name Lanschütz comes from Slavic/Slovak Lǫžnica. Proto-Slavic lǫgъ,  modern Slovak luh - riparian forest. The Slovaks later adopted Hungarian name Cseklész (Čeklís). It was given its current name after World War II and is named after Anton Bernolák.

Demography
Over the course of 2010s, the village experienced fast growth due to the proximity to Bratislava. The 2021 census has found the number of houses increased sharply from 1,773 in 2011 to 3,724 in 2021, representing the fastest growth rate out of all municipalities in Slovakia. The new housing construction was associated with the fast growth of population from less than 6,000 inhabitants in 2011 to the current population of more than 9,000. 
Population by nationality:

See also
 List of municipalities and towns in Slovakia
 Čeklís Castle

References

Famous people
 Ján Popluhár, Slovak football player
 Laco Déczi, Slovak-American jazz trumpeter and composer

Genealogical resources

The records for genealogical research are available at the state archive "Statny Archiv in Bratislava, Slovakia"

 Roman Catholic church records (births/marriages/deaths): 1687-1930 (parish A)
 Reformated church records (births/marriages/deaths): 1787-1924 (parish B)

External links

 Municipal website 
Surnames of living people in Bernolakovo

Villages and municipalities in Senec District